Frank Robert Diven  (August 29, 1859 – May 30, 1914), was a professional baseball player who played pitcher in the Major Leagues for the 1883 Baltimore Orioles of the American Association and outfielder for the 1886 New York Giants of the National League.

External links

1859 births
1914 deaths
Major League Baseball pitchers
Major League Baseball outfielders
Baltimore Orioles (AA) players
New York Giants (NL) players
19th-century baseball players
Scranton Indians players
Waterbury Brass Citys players
Hartford Dark Blues (minor league) players
Easton (minor league baseball) players
Baseball players from New York (state)
Burials at the Cemetery of the Evergreens